William Benjamin Chapman (December 25, 1908 – July 7, 1993) was an American outfielder and manager in Major League Baseball who played for several teams. He began his career with the New York Yankees, playing his first seven seasons there. 

During the period from 1926 to 1943, Chapman had more stolen bases than any other player, leading the American League four times. After 12 seasons, during which he batted .302 and led the AL in assists and double plays twice each, he spent two years in the minor leagues and returned to the majors as a National League pitcher for three seasons, becoming player-manager of the Philadelphia Phillies, his final team.

Chapman's playing reputation was eclipsed by the role he played in 1947 as manager of the Phillies, antagonizing Jackie Robinson by shouting racist epithets and opposing his presence on a major league team on the basis of Robinson's race with unsportsmanlike conduct that was an embarrassment for his team. He was fired the following season and never managed in the majors again.

Playing career
Born in Nashville, Tennessee, in 1908, Chapman batted and threw right-handed. He was a teammate of Babe Ruth, Lou Gehrig, Joe DiMaggio, and other stars on the Yankees from 1930 through the middle of the 1936 season. In his 1930 rookie season with the Yankees, during which he batted .316, Chapman played exclusively in the infield as a second and third baseman. Although he played only 91 games at third, he led the AL in errors, and after Joe Sewell was acquired in the offseason, Chapman was shifted to the outfield to take advantage of his speed and throwing arm. He led the AL in stolen bases for the next three seasons (1931–33); his 1931 total of 61 was the highest by a Yankee since Fritz Maisel's 74 in 1914, and was the most by any major leaguer between 1921 and 1961 (equalled only by George Case in 1943). With the Yankees, Chapman also batted over .300 and scored 100 runs four times each, drove in 100 runs twice, led the AL in triples in 1934, and made each of the first three AL All-Star teams from 1933 to 1935, leading off in the 1933 game as the first AL hitter in All-Star history. In one game on July 9, 1932, Chapman hit three home runs, two of which were inside-the-park. In the 1932 World Series, he batted .294 with six runs batted in as the Yankees swept the Chicago Cubs.

It was in New York that the extent of Chapman's bigotry first surfaced. He taunted Jewish fans at Yankee Stadium with Nazi salutes and disparaging epithets. In a 1933 game, his intentional spiking of Washington Senators' second baseman Buddy Myer (who was believed to be Jewish)
caused a 20-minute brawl that saw 300 fans participate and resulted in five-game suspensions and $100 fines for each of the players involved.

In June 1936, Chapman – then hitting .266 and expendable with the arrival of DiMaggio – was traded to the Senators. The player the Yankees received in return was Jake Powell, who would become infamous for a 1938 radio interview in which he stated that he liked to crack Blacks over the head with his nightstick as a police officer during the off-season.

Chapman rebounded following the trade to finish the year with a .315 average, again making the All-Star team, scoring 100 runs and collecting a career-high 50 doubles. The Senators sent him to the Boston Red Sox in June 1937, and that season he led the AL in steals for the fourth time with 35. The following year, he hit a career-best .340 with Boston, after which he was traded to the Cleveland Indians. After two seasons in which he hit .290 and .286, Cleveland sent Chapman back to Washington in December 1940. He hit .255 in his return to the Senators before they released him in May 1941. The Chicago White Sox then picked him up, but after he batted only .226 over the remainder of the year, his major league career appeared to be finished.

Managerial career
After managing in the Class B Piedmont League in 1942 and 1944 – he was suspended for the 1943 season for punching an umpire – Chapman resurfaced as a pitcher in the National League with the Brooklyn Dodgers in 1944, earning five wins against three losses. After starting the next year 3–3, he was traded to the Phillies on June 15, 1945, becoming player-manager on June 30. He made three relief appearances for the team that year, played his final game in 1946 with  innings of relief, and continued as non-playing manager. He appeared in 1,717 games over 15 seasons, batting .302 lifetime with 1,958 hits, 407 doubles, 107 triples, 90 home runs, 824 walks, 1,144 runs, 977 runs batted in, and 287 stolen bases, and winning eight of 14 decisions as a pitcher; his 184 steals with the Yankees placed him second in team history behind Hal Chase.

Jackie Robinson

Chapman had replaced Freddie Fitzsimmons as manager of the Phillies in 1945 with that team buried in last place (winner of only 17 of 68 games). The team improved somewhat through the end of the year, and climbed to fifth place in 1946, the first year of the postwar baseball boom and the last season in which the color line was in effect. In April 1947, Brooklyn called up Jackie Robinson from the Montreal Royals and made him their regular first baseman. Chapman's Phillies were not the only NL team to oppose racial integration – several Dodger players tried to petition management to keep him off the team – but during an early-season series in Brooklyn, the level of verbal abuse directed by Chapman and his players at Robinson reached such proportions that it made headlines in the New York and national press. Chapman instructed his pitchers, whenever they had a 3–0 count against Robinson, to bean him rather than walk him.

Chapman's attempts to intimidate Robinson eventually backfired, with the Dodgers rallying behind Robinson, and there was increased sympathy for Robinson in many circles. The backlash against Chapman was so severe that he was asked to pose in a photograph with Robinson as a conciliatory gesture when the two teams next met in Philadelphia in May. This incident prompted Robinson's teammate Dixie Walker to comment, "I never thought I'd see old Ben eat shit like that."

Robinson went on to stardom and a 10-year career, a place in the Baseball Hall of Fame, and a revered position in American sporting and civil rights history. Chapman's baseball career, however, was coming to an end. He survived the 1947 season, but the Phillies fell to seventh place. In July 1948, with the team still in seventh, Chapman was fired and eventually replaced by Eddie Sawyer. He surfaced one more time in the majors, as a coach for the 1952 Cincinnati Reds. Chapman's career major league managing record was 196–276 (.415).

In an interview with journalist Ray Robinson in the 1990s, Chapman stated, "A man learns about things and mellows as he grows older. I think that maybe I've changed a bit. Maybe I went too far in those days. But I always went along with the bench jockeying, which has always been part of the game. Maybe I was rougher at it than some other players. I thought that you could use it to upset and weaken the other team. It might give you an advantage. The world changes." Reflecting on the success of his son, then coaching black players on an integrated football team, "Look, I'm real proud I've raised my son different. And he gets along well with them. They like him. That's a nice thing, don't you think?"

Personal life
Chapman's first wife, Mary Elizabeth Payne, divorced Chapman on June 11, 1935, getting the divorce in Birmingham, Alabama. In the divorce petition, Payne charged Chapman with domestic violence.

Chapman later worked in insurance in Alabama. He was a consultant on Iron Horse: Lou Gehrig in His Time, Ray Robinson's 2006 biography of Lou Gehrig.

In 1993, Chapman died of a heart attack at age 84 at his home in Hoover, Alabama. He was interred at Birmingham's Elmwood Cemetery.

In popular culture
The newspaper headline "Red Sox beat Yanks 5–4 on Chapman's Homer", a possibly intentional pun on the title of John Keats' poem "On First Looking into Chapman's Homer", is mentioned in Vladimir Nabokov's 1962 novel Pale Fire (lines 97–98), where it is misinterpreted by the character Charles Kinbote.  Sources disagree on whether the headline is genuine or not.

In Harry Turtledove's 2003 alternate history novel Southern Victory: American Empire: The Victorious Opposition, one of the Freedom Party Guards appears to be Chapman.

In the 2013 film 42, Chapman is played by Alan Tudyk and is portrayed as an antagonist in the film.

In season 25, episode 17 of The Simpsons, Homer accuses Marge of “being that racist Philadelphia manager” as Marge replies “stop comparing me to Ben Chapman”.

See also

List of Major League Baseball player-managers
List of Major League Baseball career triples leaders
List of Major League Baseball career runs scored leaders
List of Major League Baseball annual triples leaders
List of Major League Baseball annual stolen base leaders
Major League Baseball titles leaders

References

External links

 Ben Chapman - Baseballbiography.com

1908 births
1993 deaths
Major League Baseball outfielders
Major League Baseball player-managers
American League All-Stars
American League stolen base champions
New York Yankees players
Washington Senators (1901–1960) players
Boston Red Sox players
Cleveland Indians players
Chicago White Sox players
Brooklyn Dodgers players
Philadelphia Phillies players
Philadelphia Phillies managers
Cincinnati Reds coaches
Minor league baseball managers
Asheville Tourists players
St. Paul Saints (AA) players
Richmond Colts players
Gadsden Chiefs players
Baseball players from Nashville, Tennessee
Burials at Elmwood Cemetery (Birmingham, Alabama)
Jackie Robinson